is the 18th single by Japanese entertainer Akina Nakamori. Written by Biddu, Winston Sela, and Keiko Asō, the single was released on June 3, 1987, by Warner Pioneer through the Reprise label. It was also the second single from her fourth compilation album Best II.

Background 
"Blonde" is the Japanese-language version of the song "The Look That Kills", which was from Nakamori's 1987 English-language album Cross My Palm. It was given a different arrangement by Satoshi Nakamura. On live TV performances, Nakamori wore a costume designed by Hermès.

Nakamori has re-recorded "Blonde" for the 1995 compilation True Album Akina 95 Best.

Chart performance 
"Blonde" became Nakamori's 16th No. 1 on Oricon's weekly singles chart and sold over 301,400 copies.

Track listing

Charts

References

External links 
 
 
 

1987 singles
1987 songs
Akina Nakamori songs
Japanese-language songs
Warner Music Japan singles
Reprise Records singles
Oricon Weekly number-one singles
Songs written by Biddu